Alan Villafuerte (born 29 June 1977) is a Dutch trampoline gymnast. He represented the Netherlands at the 2000 Summer Olympics in Sydney, Australia and at the 2004 Summer Olympics in Athens, Greece. In the men's trampoline competition in 2000 he finished in 7th place. In the men's trampoline competition in 2004 he finished in 15th place in the qualification round.

References

External links 
 

Living people
1977 births
Place of birth missing (living people)
Dutch male trampolinists
Olympic gymnasts of the Netherlands
Gymnasts at the 2000 Summer Olympics
Gymnasts at the 2004 Summer Olympics